William Addison Lathrop (1864 – January 3, 1925) was an American author, playwright, and screenwriter for silent films.

Lathrop was born in Cincinnati, Ohio, in 1864 and graduated in 1885 from Hamilton College in Clinton, New York.  He taught at Brooklyn Polytechnic until 1891, and then was admitted to the bar.  In addition to writing scenarios for silent films in the 1910s, his first novel Love Time in Picardy was published in 1919.  Many of his plays were co-written with his wife, Mabel.  He died of a heart attack in New York City on January 3, 1925.

References

External links
 
 
 Little Stories from the Screen (Britton 1917) (scenarios submitted by Lathrop to studios as basis for silent films) 
 Love Time in Picardy (1919)
 The Man That Never Grew Up (1919) (with Mabel C. Lathrop)

1864 births
1925 deaths
20th-century American novelists
Novelists from Ohio
People from Cincinnati
Hamilton College (New York) alumni